Gisela Dulko was the defending champion, but chose to participate in the Porsche Tennis Grand Prix which was held the same week.

In the final, Anabel Medina Garrigues defeated Ekaterina Makarova, 6–0, 6–1.

Seeds

Draw

Finals

Top half

Bottom half

External links
Main Draw
Qualifying Draw

Grand Prix SAR La Princesse Lalla Meryem - Singles
Morocco Open
2009 in Moroccan tennis